Egyptian Hieroglyphs is a Unicode block containing the Gardiner's sign list of Egyptian hieroglyphs.

Block

The Egyptian Hieroglyphs Unicode block has 94 standardized variants defined to specify rotated signs:
 Variation selector-1 (VS1) (U+FE00) can be used to rotate 39 signs by 90°:U+13091–13092, 1310F, 1311C, 13121, 13127, 13139, 131A0, 131B1, 131B8–131B9, 131CB, 131F9–131FA, 1327F, 13285, 1328C, 132AA, 132CB, 132DC, 132E7, 13307, 1331B, 13322, 1333B–1333C, 13377–13378, 13399–1339A, 133D3, 133F2, 133F5–133F6, 13403, 13416, 13419–1341A and 13423
 VS2 (U+FE01) can be used to rotate 20 signs by 180°:U+13093, 130A9, 13187, 131B1, 131EE, 131F8–131FA, 13257, 1327F, 132A4, 13308, 13312–13314, 1331B, 13321–13322, 13331 and 13419
 VS3 (U+FE02) can be used to rotate 35 signs by 270°:U+13117, 13139, 13183, 131A0, 131BA, 131EE, 13216, 1327B, 132A4, 132E7, 132E9, 132F8, 132FD, 13302–13303, 13310–13314, 1331C, 13321, 13331, 1334A, 13361, 13373, 1337D, 13385, 133AF–133B0, 133BF, 133DD, 13419, 1342C and 1342E

History
The following Unicode-related documents record the purpose and process of defining specific characters in the Egyptian Hieroglyphs block:

See also 
 List of Egyptian hieroglyphs
 Egyptian Hieroglyph Format Controls Unicode block

Further reading

References 

Unicode blocks